Podena (Fedan) is one of the Austronesian Sarmi languages spoken on the coast  of Jayapura Bay and on a nearby island in the Papua province of Indonesia.

See also
Sarmi languages for a comparison with related languages

References

Languages of western New Guinea
Sarmi–Jayapura languages
Endangered Austronesian languages